Pouligny may refer to:

Communes 

Pouligny-Notre-Dame, a commune in Indre, France
Pouligny-Saint-Martin, a commune in Indre, France
Pouligny-Saint-Pierre, a commune in Indre, France

Other 

Pouligny-Saint-Pierre cheese, a cheese made in Indre, France